"Too Many Times" is a song written by Micheal Smotherman, Scott Page, and Tony McShear and recorded by American country music artist Earl Thomas Conley and R&B artist Anita Pointer. It was released in July 1986 as the first single and title track from Conley's album Too Many Times. It reached number 2 on the Billboard Hot Country Singles & Tracks chart.

Chart performance

References

1986 singles
1986 songs
Earl Thomas Conley songs
RCA Records singles
Song recordings produced by Mark Wright (record producer)
Songs written by Micheal Smotherman
Male–female vocal duets